Live at Manchester Free Trade Hall '75 is a live album by the Jack Bruce Band released in 2003. It was compiled from a rough mix of a recording of a performance at Manchester Free Trade Hall in June 1975, the only surviving remnant of an abandoned live album project. Bruce's bass guitar is not very prominent in the mix.

Track listing
All songs by Pete Brown and Jack Bruce, except where indicated

Disc one
 "Can You Follow?" – 1:45 	
 "Morning Story" – 7:56 	
 "Keep It Down" – 5:45 	
 "Pieces of Mind" – 5:56 	
 "Tickets to Waterfalls/Weird of Hermiston/Post War" – 25:08 	
 "Spirit" (Tony Williams) – 10:44

Disc two
 "One/You Burned the Tables on Me" – 17:01
 "Smiles and Grins" – 24:39
 "Sunshine of Your Love" (Brown, Bruce, Eric Clapton) – 12:07

Personnel
Musicians
 Jack Bruce – vocals, bass guitar, piano
 Carla Bley – clavinet, Mellotron, organ, electric piano, synthesizer
 Bruce Gary – drums
 Ronnie Leahy – piano, electric piano, synthesizer
 Mick Taylor – guitar

 Production
 Joe Black – project coordinator
 Paschal Byrne – digital editing, remastering
 Mark Powell – liner notes, producer, research
 Margrit Seyffer – reissue
 Phil Smee – CD package design

References

2003 live albums
Jack Bruce albums
Polydor Records live albums